The Air Forces Memorial, or Runnymede Memorial, in Englefield Green, near Egham, Surrey, England is a memorial dedicated to some 20,456 men and women from air forces of the British Empire who were lost in air and other operations during World War II. Those recorded have no known grave anywhere in the world, and many were lost without trace. The name of each of these airmen and airwomen is engraved into the stone walls of the memorial, according to country and squadron.

Design
The memorial was commissioned and is maintained by the Commonwealth War Graves Commission.  The architect was Sir Edward Maufe with sculpture by Vernon Hill. The engraved glass and painted ceilings were designed by John Hutton, and the poem engraved on the gallery window was written by Paul H Scott. It was the first post-World War II building to be listed for architectural merit.

From the memorial there are views over the River Thames and Runnymede Meadow, where Magna Carta was sealed by King John in 1215. Distant views of London may be had from the viewpoint in the memorial tower; such monuments as the London Eye and the arch of Wembley Stadium are visible on clear days. Windsor Castle and the surrounding area can be seen to the West.

Location
The memorial is on Coopers Hill Lane, Englefield Green, next to the former Runnymede campus of Brunel University and Kingswood Hall of Royal Holloway, University of London since 1965 when it was converted from a convent.

For location map, showing its proximity to other Runnymede memorials, see Runnymede.

Status
It is a Grade II* listed building and was completed in 1953.

People memorialised
Amongst the many thousands of airmen and women whose names are recorded on the Memorial are:
 Flight Sergeant Edwin Watson, Scottish Air Gunner and Professional Footballer known as The Flying Fifer
 Flight Lieutenant Howard Peter Blatchford, Canadian Battle of Britain veteran pilot
 Flying Officer David Moore Crook, fighter pilot
 Flight Lieutenant Arthur ('Art') Donahue, American RAF Flying ace, author
 Flight Lieutenant John Dundas, flying ace
 Wing Commander Brendan (Paddy) Finucane, flying ace
 Squadron Leader Hilary Hood, Battle of Britain pilot casualty
 First Officer ATA Amy Johnson, aviator
 Pilot Officer Vernon ('Shorty') Keogh, American RAF Battle of Britain pilot
 Assistant Section Officer Noor Inayat Khan, GC recipient, SOE agent
 Sergeant Leslie Lack, pre-war Arsenal F.C. football player 
 Flight Lieutenant Eric Lock, flying ace
 Pilot Officer William (Willie) McKnight, Canadian flying ace
 Wing Commander John Dering Nettleton, VC recipient
 Pilot Officer Esmond Romilly, anti-fascist writer
 Pilot Officer Derek Teden, England rugby international
 Wing Commander Alois Vasatko, Czech flying ace
 Squadron Leader Geoffrey Warnes of No. 263 Squadron RAF

See also

Grade II* listed war memorials in England

References

External links

Commonwealth War Graves Commission - official site

Detailed description and images of the Memorial

Buildings and structures on the River Thames
Royal Air Force memorials
World War II memorials in England
Monuments and memorials in Surrey
Grade II* listed buildings in Surrey
Commonwealth War Graves Commission memorials